Christian Robini (January 11, 1946 – September 29, 2001) was a French cyclist. In 1967, while an amateur, he won the Tour de l'Avenir. As a professional cyclist from 1968 to 1970, he participated in the Tour de France.

Palmarès
1967
Tour de l'Avenir

References

1946 births
2001 deaths
French male cyclists